Yaroslav Iosseliani (1912–1978) was a Soviet Navy submarine commander of Georgian ethnicity. He was awarded the honorary title Hero of the Soviet Union.

Iosseliani was born in the village of Lakhiri in the Svaneti region of Georgia and was educated in Gagra. He joined the Soviet Navy in 1934 and finished the Leningrad Naval branch of the Frunze Higher Naval School in 1938.

Iosseliani was posted to the Black Sea Fleet where he served on submarines Shch-207 and Shch-207 before commanding the submarine M-111. He completed 11 war patrols, made 12 attacks, sinking 2 enemy transports and a lighter, a total tonnage of 14,000.

In 1944, Iosseliani was given command of the former  which was transferred to the Soviet Navy under lend lease. This boat was renamed V-4 and also given the name Svanetia after Iosseliani's homeland. Under his command V-4 sunk the German submarine chaser UJ-1219.

Iosseliani retired in 1966 and moved to Tbilisi, where he died in 1978.

Honours and awards
 Hero of the Soviet Union
 Order of Lenin
 Order of the Red Banner, four times
 Order of Nakhimov, 2nd class
 Order of the Patriotic War, 1st class
 Order of the Red Star

References
site in Russian from heroes of the Nation

1912 births
1978 deaths
People from Samegrelo-Zemo Svaneti
Svan people
People of World War II from Georgia (country)
Heroes of the Soviet Union
Recipients of the Order of Lenin
Recipients of the Order of Nakhimov, 2nd class
Recipients of the Order of the Red Banner
Soviet military personnel of World War II
Soviet submarine commanders